Tracing may refer to:

Computer graphics
 Image tracing, digital image processing to convert raster graphics into vector graphics
 Path tracing, a method of rendering images of three-dimensional scenes such that the global illumination is faithful to reality
 Ray tracing (graphics), techniques in computer graphics 
 Boundary tracing (also known as contour tracing), a segmentation technique that identifies the boundary pixels of the digital region

Software engineering
 Tracing (software), a method of debugging in computer programming
 System monitoring
 Application performance management

Physics
 Ray tracing (physics), a method for calculating the path of waves or particles
 Dye tracing, tracking various flows using dye added to the liquid in question

Other uses
 Tracing (art), copying an object or drawing, especially with the use of translucent tracing paper
 Tracing (criminology), determining crime scene activity from trace evidence left at crime scenes
 Tracing (law), a legal process by which a claimant demonstrates what has happened to their property
 Anterograde tracing, and Retrograde tracing, biological research techniques used to map the connections of neurons
 Call tracing, a procedure that permits an entitled user to be informed about the routing of data for an established connection
 Curve sketching, a process for determining the shape of a geometric curve
 Family Tracing and Reunification, a process whereby disaster response teams locate separated family members
 Tracking and tracing, a process of monitoring the location and status of property in transit
 Curve tracing, a method for analyzing the characteristics of semiconductors; see Semiconductor curve tracer
 Tracing (as with a gun or camera), tracking an object, as with the use of tracer ammunition
 Contact tracing, finding and identifying people in contact with someone with an infectious disease

See also
 
 Trace (disambiguation)
 Tracer (disambiguation)
 Tracking (disambiguation)